Colin Ian Miles (born Colin Pluck; 6 September 1978) is an English former footballer who played as a defender.

He began his career with Watford between 1996 and 2000, though would play little role in the club's rise from the Second Division to the Premier League. After a stint with Greenock Morton in 2000, he moved on to non-league Dover Athletic later in the year following spells with Greenock Morton and Stevenage Borough. In 2001, he signed with Yeovil Town; he would become a cult figure at the club over his five-year stay, helping them win promotion from the Conference National to League One. He spent two years from 2006 with Port Vale, before ending his career with Woking at the end of the 2008–09 season.

Career
Miles began his career with Watford, making his senior debut on 20 September 1997 at the Priestfield Stadium, he was replaced by the veteran Nigel Gibbs on 69 minutes and watched the "Horns" play out a 2–2 draw with Gillingham. On 9 December, he played 90 minutes of a 1–0 defeat to Fulham at Craven Cottage in the first round of the Football League Trophy. Watford won the Second Division championship that season, before winning promotion to the Premier League in 1998–99. Not cut out for the top tier, this spelt the end of Miles' time at the club. In February 2000, he signed with Greenock Morton, playing five games in their 1999–2000 campaign, before heading back to England with Stevenage Borough in March. From the Premier League to the Scottish First Division, he finished the season in the Conference National, playing three games of the 1999–2000 Conference season. He spent part of October and November 2000 with Conference strugglers Hayes – scoring an own goal on his debut, before signing with Dover Athletic in December. He played eleven games for Dover, before departing at the end of the season.

When, in June 2001, Miles ended up at Yeovil Town, he had finally found stability in his career. Playing thirty games in the 2001–02 season, his first senior goal came 21 minutes into a 17 November fixture with Margate, in what was the only goal that night at Hartsdown Park. His second goal came on 29 January, seven minutes into a 2–2 home draw with Forest Green Rovers. On 12 May, he played in the FA Trophy final against Stevenage at Villa Park, Yeovil winning 2–0. In 2002–03, the "Glovers" stormed to the Conference title, seventeen points clear of Morecambe. Miles scored against both Stevenage and Kettering Town, but it was his bookings that got him attention. He had been booked twelve times in 38 games, as well as being sent off against Telford United. Miles and Yeovil's rise to the Football League was a spectacular one, as they finished a healthy 8th. Miles played 41 games, 36 of which were in League Two. He scored six goals, an impressive total for a defender, his goals coming against York City, Wrexham, Lincoln City, Barnet, Cambridge United and Bristol Rovers – all at home. He was again frequently in trouble with referees, picking up eight bookings, including a run of four cards in four games.

In 2004–05, Yeovil won the league, though Miles made just 24 appearances, including three in the FA Cup. He scored against Darlington in the cup and was sent off in the league against Shrewsbury Town. In February, he tore a knee liagement, keeping him out of action for a few weeks. At the end of the season he signed a new one-year deal with the club. The 2005–06 season was his last with Yeovil. He made 30 League One appearances, as well as five cup appearances. In June, he signed with League One rivals Port Vale, sensing the Burslem club were "going places".

Martin Foyle played him 33 times in 2006–07, including him in the League Cup tie with Tottenham Hotspur at White Hart Lane that finished 3–1 to "Spurs". He was sent off against Bradford City on 16 September, but kept his yellow card tally down to a respectable four. He took the field just five times in 2007–08 as he struggled with poor form and a swollen knee. New manager Lee Sinnott chose against offering Miles a new deal in the summer. In August, he returned to Conference football with Woking. Woking suffered relegation in 2008–09, seven points off the safety spot occupied by Barrow. Miles played thirty games, scoring on his final appearance, in a 2–2 draw with Mansfield Town at Kingfield Stadium on 18 April. He was dismissed from the pitch twice in the season, in away games at Eastbourne Borough (for foul and abusive language) and Barrow. He was released upon the season's conclusion.

Style of play

Personal life
He changed his surname from Pluck to Miles in 2004, for family reasons.

Career statistics

Honours
Watford
Football League Second Division: 1997–98

Yeovil Town'
FA Trophy: 2002
Conference National: 2002–03
League Two: 2004–05

References

External links

Profile at Ciderspace (Yeovil Town fansite)

1978 births
Living people
Footballers from Edmonton, London
English footballers
Association football defenders
Watford F.C. players
Greenock Morton F.C. players
Stevenage F.C. players
Hayes F.C. players
Dover Athletic F.C. players
Yeovil Town F.C. players
Port Vale F.C. players
Woking F.C. players
English Football League players
National League (English football) players